Çemberlitaş is a Turkish word meaning "hooped stone" and may refer to:

 The Column of Constantine, a Roman monumental column in Istanbul, Turkey
 Forum of Constantine, containing the column, today known as Çemberlitaş Square
 Çemberlitaş, Fatih, the neighborhood of Istanbul containing the column and the forum
 Çemberlitaş Hamamı, a Turkish bath in Istanbul, Turkey
 Çemberlitaş, Adıyaman, a village in the District of Adıyaman, Adıyaman Province, Turkey